Agneta Bolme Börjefors (26 April 1941 – 11 August 2008) was a Swedish television presenter, television producer and royal reporter for Sveriges Television. Agneta Bolme was born in Stockholm, Sweden. Her brother, Tomas Bolme, is a Swedish actor. She recorded over 600 episodes of the children's show  as Drutten, the Swedish incarnation of the Russian character Cheburashka.

Agneta Bolme Börjefors died on 11 August 2008, at the age of 67.

Filmography 
1957 - Snödrottningen (voice)
1969 -  (voice)

External links 
 Agneta Bolme Börjefors dies

References

1941 births
2008 deaths
Writers from Stockholm
Swedish women journalists
Swedish television hosts
Swedish television journalists
20th-century Swedish journalists